

Argentina
Head coach: Carlos Pachamé

Australia
Head coach: Frank Arok

Brazil
Head coach: Carlos Alberto Silva

China
Head coach: Gao Fengwen

Guatemala
Head coach: Jorge Roldán

Iraq
Head coach:  Ammo Baba

Italy
Head coach: Francesco Rocca

South Korea
Head coach:  Kim Jung-Nam

Nigeria
Head coach:  Manfred Höner

Sweden
Head coach: Benny Lennartsson

Tunisia
Head coach:  Antoni Piechniczek

United States
Head coach: Lothar Osiander

Soviet Union
Head coach: Anatoliy Byshovets

West Germany
Head coach: Hannes Löhr

Yugoslavia
Head coach: Ivica Osim

Zambia
Head coach: Samuel Ndhlovu

References

External links
Argentina squad at AFA
sports-reference

1988 Summer Olympics
Football at the 1988 Summer Olympics